Daer may refer to:

 Lord Daer, a subsidiary title in the Peerage of Scotland, held by the Earl of Selkirk, used by courtesy by his eldest son.
 Daer Water, a tributary river of the River Clyde, Scotland.
 Daer Reservoir a manmade loch on the above.
 Daer ales a beetle, the only species in the genus Daer
 Arthur Daer (1905–1980), cricketer
 Harry Daer (1918–1980), cricketer